Yan Ning (born November 1977) is a Chinese structural biologist and the founding dean of the Shenzhen Medical Academy of Research and Translation. She previously served as the Shirley M. Tilghman Professor of Molecular Biology at Princeton University where her laboratory studied the structural and chemical basis for membrane transport and lipid metabolism.

Career 
Yan was born 1977 in Zhangqiu, Jinan, Shandong. She received her B.S. degree from the Department of Biological Sciences & Biotechnology, Tsinghua University, in 2000. She then studied molecular biology at Princeton University, under the supervision of Shi Yigong, and received her Ph.D. degree in 2004. Her doctoral dissertation was titled "Biochemical and structural dissection of the regulation of apoptotic pathways in Drosophila and C. elegans." She was the regional winner of the Young Scientist Award in North America, which is co-sponsored by Science/AAAS and GE Healthcare, for her thesis on the structural and mechanistic study of programmed cell death. She continued her postdoctoral training at Princeton, focusing on the structural characterization of intramembrane proteases, until 2007.

In 2007, she returned to Tsinghua University with an invitation by Zhao Nanming, director of the Department of Biology at the time. At the age of 30, she became the youngest professor and Ph.D. advisor in Tsinghua. Her research focused on the structure and mechanism of membrane transport proteins, exemplified by the glucose transporter GLUT1 and voltage-gated sodium and calcium channels.

In 2017, Yan decided to leave Tsinghua and join Princeton University. The move gained widespread attention in China and led to a national discussion both within the science community and the general public. The cause was widely speculated to be the difficulty to do what she wanted to do under China's academic system, as she had criticized the China National Natural Science Foundation's reluctance to support high risk research in a series of blogs. However, Yan dismissed this claim later, and stated "changing one's environment can bring new pressure and inspiration for academic breakthroughs".

For her research achievements, Dr. Yan has won a number of prizes. She was an HHMI international early career scientist in 2012–2017, the recipient of the 2015 Protein Society Young Investigator Award, the 2015 Beverley & Raymond Sackler International Prize in Biophysics, the Alexander M. Cruickshank Award at the GRC on membrane transport proteins in 2016, the 2018 FAOBMB Award for Research Excellence, and the 2019 Weizmann Women & Science Award. Yan was elected a foreign associate of the US National Academy of Sciences in April 2019. Yan was elected as a member of the American Academy of Arts and Sciences in 2021.

On November 1, 2022, while speaking at the Shenzhen Global Innovation Forum of Talents, Yan announced that she will be resigning from her position at Princeton and will return to China to become a founding dean of the Shenzhen Medical Academy of Research and Translation. In December 2022, she resigned from Princeton and returned to China, where she accepted her new position.

Honors and awards

2019 

 National Academy of Sciences Foreign Associate, National Academy of Sciences
 Weizmann Women & Science Award, Weizmann Institute of Science

2018 

 FAOBMB Award for Excellence, Federation of National Societies of Biochemistry and Molecular Biology in the Asian and Oceanian Region

2017 

 Wu-Janssen Award in Biomedical Basic Research, China
 Teaching award, Tsinghua University

2016 

Alexander M. Cruickshank Award for the Gordon Research Conference on Membrane Transport Proteins: Molecules to Medicine

2015 

 The Protein Science Young Investigator Award, Protein Society
 The Raymond and Beverly Sackler International Prize in Biophysics, Tel Aviv University

2014 

 Cell "40under40", Cell
 Promega Awards for Biochemistry, Promega
Cheung Kong Scholar, Ministry of Education, China
 The Ho Leung Ho Lee Award for Advancement in Science and Technology, China

2012 

 Howard Hughes Medical Institute International Early Career Scientist, HHMI
Award for “Women in Science” of China
CC Tan Award for Innovation in Life Sciences, China

2011 

National Outstanding Young Scientist Award, China

2006 

 Young Scientist Award (North America Regional Winner), AAAS/Science and GE

References

External links 
 Nieng Yan's page

1977 births
Living people
Chinese women biologists
Princeton University alumni
Princeton University faculty
Tsinghua University alumni
Biologists from Shandong
People from Laiwu
Chinese molecular biologists
Foreign associates of the National Academy of Sciences
Educators from Shandong
Structural biologists